Scott Monroe Sterling (March 2, 1962 – August 27, 1987), known by the stage name DJ Scott La Rock, was an American hip-hop disc jockey and music producer from the Bronx, New York. He was a founding member of the East Coast hip hop group Boogie Down Productions.

Sterling's death in August 1987 is said to be the first murder of a major hip hop artist.

Early life 

Scott Sterling was born on March 2, 1962, in the Bronx, New York City. His parents separated when he was four years old, so he was raised by his mother, Carolyn Morant, a municipal employee. They moved from Queens, New York City, to the Bronx: first Morrisania and then Morris Heights.

He excelled in both academics and sports at Our Saviour Lutheran High School, graduating in 1980. He attended Castleton State College in Vermont and earned a varsity letter in basketball there.

Career 
La Rock returned to New York City in hopes of finding work and making inroads to the music industry. Through a connection of his mother's, La Rock landed a job as a social worker at Franklin Armory Men's Shelter on 166th Street in the Bronx. At night, though, he spun records at the hip hop hot spot the Broadway Repertoire Theatre.

During his time as a social worker, La Rock met rapper KRS-One in 1986 at Franklin Men's Shelter where KRS resided. The pair formed Boogie Down Productions (BDP) with DJ Derrick "D-Nice" Jones, a cousin of the shelter's security guard, Floyd Payne. The group's 1987 debut album, Criminal Minded, is considered a hip hop classic.

Shooting 
On August 27, 1987, D-Nice was assaulted by men upset that he had been talking to one of their ex-girlfriends. D-Nice asked La Rock to help defuse the situation. Later that day, La Rock, Scotty "Manager Moe" Morris, DJ McBooo, D-Nice and BDP bodyguard Darrell rode a Jeep CJ-7 to the Highbridge Homes Projects building on University Avenue in the South Bronx. As they were leaving, bullets were fired through the side and top of the Jeep. La Rock struck his head on the dashboard, not realizing at the time he had been struck by a bullet in the back of his head. He was driven to Lincoln Hospital. He was conscious as he was wheeled into the emergency department, telling doctors he was feeling cold and tired. He died in the operating room.

Two men were arrested and charged with La Rock's murder, but they were acquitted at the trial.

Discography 
 Criminal Minded (1987)
 By All Means Necessary (1988) (La Rock was killed during the making of this album)
 Man & His Music (Remixes from Around the World) (1997)
 Best of B-Boy Records (2001)

See also 
 List of murdered hip hop musicians

References 

1962 births
1987 murders in the United States
African-American rappers
American hip hop DJs
Rappers from the Bronx
Deaths by firearm in the Bronx
Castleton State College alumni
East Coast hip hop musicians
American hip hop record producers
African-American record producers
American murder victims
20th-century American businesspeople
American social workers
People murdered in New York City
Male murder victims
20th-century American rappers
Record producers from New York (state)
Burials at Woodlawn Cemetery (Bronx, New York)
1987 deaths
20th-century African-American musicians